Csaba Köves (born 27 October 1966, in Budapest) is a Hungarian fencer who has won two Olympic silver medals in the team sabre competition.

References

1966 births
Living people
Hungarian male sabre fencers
Fencers at the 1992 Summer Olympics
Fencers at the 1996 Summer Olympics
Fencers at the 2000 Summer Olympics
Olympic fencers of Hungary
Olympic silver medalists for Hungary
Olympic medalists in fencing
Martial artists from Budapest
Medalists at the 1992 Summer Olympics
Medalists at the 1996 Summer Olympics
Universiade medalists in fencing
Universiade silver medalists for Hungary
Medalists at the 1991 Summer Universiade
Medalists at the 1993 Summer Universiade